Pat Morley (born 18 May 1965) is a former footballer for Cork City, Shelbourne, Limerick and Waterford United. He also works for Irish broadcaster Raidió Teilifís Éireann as a commentator and analyst on Monday Night Soccer.

A former Celtic trialist Morley made his League of Ireland debut for Waterford United away to Finn Harps on 25 November 1984 scoring a hat trick in a 4–1 win. He scored in the final of the 1985 FAI League Cup for the Blues.

Morley also scored a hat-trick on his Limerick City debut in a Munster Senior Cup clash.

He scored 4 goals in European competition: 1993–94 European Cup clash with Cwmbran Town A.F.C., an infamous 1998–99 UEFA Cup game for Shelbourne against Rangers F.C., a 1999–2000 UEFA Cup winner against IFK Goteborg and an away goal against FK Liepājas Metalurgs in a 2001 UEFA Intertoto Cup tie after missing an injury time penalty in the first leg.

He is the third highest goalscorer in the history of the League of Ireland and was top scorer in the League of Ireland Premier Division in 1992–93 and 1999–2000.

He is also Cork City's joint record goalscorer of all time.

Morley represented the Republic of Ireland national football team at youth level.

His father Jackie played for Waterford United where he won 4 League of Ireland titles in the 1970s.

In January 2009 Morley opened a menswear showroom in his native Cork.

Notes and references 

Living people
1965 births
Association football forwards
Republic of Ireland association footballers
Republic of Ireland youth international footballers
Waterford F.C. players
Limerick F.C. players
Cork City F.C. players
Shelbourne F.C. players
League of Ireland players
National Soccer League (Australia) players
Caroline Springs George Cross FC players
League of Ireland XI players